The 1966 Sam Houston State Bearkats football team represented Sam Houston State College (now known as Sam Houston State University) as a member of the Lone Star Conference (LSC) during the 1966 NAIA football season. Led by 15th-year head coach Paul Pierce, the Bearkats compiled an overall record of 6–3–1 with a mark of 4–2–1 in conference play, and finished tied for second in the LSC.

Schedule

References

Sam Houston State
Sam Houston Bearkats football seasons
Sam Houston State Bearkats football